Mike Teunissen (born 25 August 1992) is a Dutch racing cyclist, who currently rides for UCI WorldTeam .

Career
He rode at the 2013 UCI Road World Championships, and was the winner of the World Under-23 Cyclo-cross Championships in 2013. He was named in the start list for the 2015 Vuelta a España. In June 2017, he was named in the startlist for the 2017 Tour de France. 

In 2019, he had a top 10 finish in Paris-Roubaix. He was named to the start list of the 2019 Tour de France, where he was intended to be a leadout man for Dylan Groenewegen. Late in stage one as the sprint trains were coming together there was a crash, which eliminated Groenewegen's chances and ruined the team's plans of getting the stage win and yellow jersey. Teunissen seized the moment, knowing he was already in a good position, and went for the stage win anyways. He just barely edged all-time great Peter Sagan on the line, winning the Yellow Jersey in the process. The following day he was part of another stage victory in the team time trial, which gave him one more day in the race lead.

Major results

Cyclo-cross

2008–2009
 Junior Superprestige
3rd Gieten
2009–2010
 3rd Overall Junior Superprestige
1st Diegem
2nd Ruddervoorde
2nd Hamme
2nd Gieten
 Junior Gazet van Antwerpen
2nd Loenhout
3rd Koppenberg
 2nd Kalmthout
 UCI Junior World Cup
3rd Heusden-Zolder
 3rd National Junior Championships
 3rd Junior Sint-Michielsgestel
2010–2011
 2nd  UCI World Under-23 Championships
 2nd National Under-23 Championships
2011–2012
 Under-23 Superprestige
1st Hamme
3rd Gieten
3rd Diegem
3rd Hoogstraten
 2nd  UEC European Under-23 Championships
 Under-23 Gazet van Antwerpen
2nd Baal
 UCI Under-23 World Cup
3rd Tábor
2012–2013
 1st  UCI World Under-23 Championships
 1st  UEC European Under-23 Championships
 Under-23 Superprestige
1st Ruddervoorde
1st Diegem
 UCI Under-23 World Cup
1st Tábor
2nd Rome
 3rd National Under-23 Championships
 3rd Kalmthout
2013–2014
 Under-23 Superprestige
1st Zonhoven
 2nd Woerden
 3rd Surhuisterveen
 UCI Under-23 World Cup
3rd Heusden-Zolder
 3rd National Under-23 Championships

Road

2010
 1st Stage 2 (TTT) Liège–La Gleize
 4th Omloop Het Nieuwsblad Juniors
 5th Remouchamps–Ferrières–Remouchamps
2012
 4th Ronde van Limburg
 8th Paris–Roubaix Espoirs
2013
 1st Rabo Baronie Breda Classic
 National Under-23 Road Championships
2nd Road race
4th Time trial
 2nd Arno Wallaard Memorial
 5th Internationale Wielertrofee Jong Maar Moedig
 8th Overall Tour des Fjords
 8th Overall Kreiz Breizh Elites
 10th Omloop Het Nieuwsblad U23
2014
 1st Paris–Roubaix Espoirs
 1st Paris–Tours Espoirs
 1st Rabo Baronie Breda Classic
 2nd Time trial, National Under-23 Road Championships
 3rd Overall Boucles de la Mayenne
1st  Young rider classification
 3rd Omloop der Kempen
 5th Ronde van Vlaanderen U23
 6th Overall Le Triptyque des Monts et Châteaux
 10th Grote Prijs Jef Scherens
2015
 1st Prologue Tour de l'Ain
 2nd London–Surrey Classic
 7th Grand Prix Impanis-Van Petegem
 9th Paris–Tours
2016
 9th Dwars door Vlaanderen
2017
 9th Paris–Tours
2018
 2nd Dwars door Vlaanderen
 5th Road race, National Road Championships
2019
 1st  Overall Four Days of Dunkirk
1st  Points classification
1st Stages 5 & 6
 1st  Overall ZLM Tour
 Tour de France
1st Stages 1 & 2 (TTT)
Held  &  after Stages 1–2
 4th Tacx Pro Classic
 5th EuroEyes Cyclassics
 6th Overall BinckBank Tour
 6th Münsterland Giro
 7th Overall Tour of Britain
 7th Paris–Roubaix
 7th Famenne Ardenne Classic
 9th Primus Classic
 10th Three Days of Bruges–De Panne
2020
 6th Omloop Het Nieuwsblad
 8th Overall BinckBank Tour
2021
 3rd Overall Tour of Norway
1st  Points classification
 3rd Overall Danmark Rundt
 4th Road race, National Road Championships
 8th Eschborn–Frankfurt
 10th Overall Benelux Tour
2022
 Vuelta a España
1st Stage 1 (TTT)
Held  after Stage 2
2023
 8th Le Samyn
 9th Trofeo Ses Salines–Alcúdia

Grand Tour general classification results timeline
Sources:

Classics results timeline

References

External links

 
 
 
 

1992 births
Living people
Dutch male cyclists
UCI Road World Championships cyclists for the Netherlands
Cyclists from Limburg (Netherlands)
People from Venray
Dutch Tour de France stage winners